Uaboe (also known as Waboe) is a district in the island nation of Nauru, located in the northwest of the island.

Geography
Covering about 0.8 km², Uaboe has a population of 330. Uaboe is the second-smallest district in Nauru. It is the only district other than Boe to have an area less than 1.0 km². The Nauru Local Government Council lands office is located in Uaboe, and the district is a part of the Ubenide Constituency. Uaboe is also the highest settlement in Nauru.

Notable people
Timothy Detudamo, linguist and governor of Nauru, was from Uaboe.

See also
 List of settlements in Nauru
 Rail transport in Nauru

References

External links

Districts of Nauru
Populated places in Nauru